See Isaac Penington (disambiguation) for other people with a similar name.
Sir Isaac Pennington (1745–1817) was an English physician, of whom there are two portraits in the National Portrait Gallery.

Isaac Pennington was educated at Sedbergh School and St John's College, Cambridge. From 1773 to 1817 he was physician to Addenbrooke's Hospital in Cambridge and from 1793 to 1817 Regius Professor of Physic at Cambridge University.

References

External links

1745 births
1817 deaths
18th-century English medical doctors
Alumni of St John's College, Cambridge
Regius Professors of Physic (Cambridge)
Professors of chemistry (Cambridge, 1702)